Lezlie Deane (born June 1, 1964) is an American singer, musician, roller derby athlete and actress who has starred in film and television. She was once best known for her roles in horror films, including 976-EVIL (1988), Girlfriend from Hell (1989) and Freddy's Dead: The Final Nightmare (1991). In the 1990s, she was a member of the techno group Fem2Fem.

Early life and career
Deane was born Leslie Denise Lonon (the "s" in her first name being a typo by the hospital where she was born), in Corsicana, Texas. Aside from her big screen roles, Deane made guest appearances on such television shows as The Bronx Zoo, 21 Jump Street, Hunter, Freddy's Nightmares, Dynasty and Pacific Blue. She was also once a member of the Dallas Cowboys Cheerleaders squad, but was fired after six weeks for punching a choreographer.

Fem2Fem
In the 1990s, she was recruited by producers Peter Rafelson and Michael Lewis to join the dance-pop group Fem2Fem, and toured Europe and North America as an opening act for Nine Inch Nails and Marilyn Manson. Songs from their second album, Animus, generated three top 40 singles, including "Obsession" and "Where Did Love Go", reaching No. 1 on the UK charts. Fem2Fem is also remembered for an appearance in Playboy magazine.

After touring with Nine Inch Nails, Lezlie recorded early demos of her songs with musicians Josh Freese, Danny Lohner and Robin Finck, which would be returned to in later projects.

Later career
In 2007, Deane was named captain and coach of the Slaughterers, one of five roller derby teams under the Dallas Derby Devils, and coached them to three consecutive first place seasons before leaving the league.

Deane formed the band Scary Cherry and the Bang Bangs. Dubbed "glitter punks" by their following in the UK, the group is known for their blend of 1970s punk rock and glitter rock. The band tours extensively, have received licensing of several songs and have released one five-song EP and a full-length album, Girl. The band won an Independent Music Award (Vox Populi "voice of the people") for best rock song, "Don't Wanna".

In the 2010 documentary Never Sleep Again: The Elm Street Legacy, Deane revealed that she began having flashbacks of being molested as a child during the filming of Freddy's Dead, and that she sustained an injury on set from Robert Englund, which resulted in her needing stitches and a tetanus shot.

Deane has been a volunteer board member for the Girls Rock Dallas non-profit music camp since its inception in 2011.

Filmography
976-EVIL (1989) – Suzie
 Dynasty (1981 TV series) (1989) (TV) - Phoenix Chisolm
Freddy's Nightmares (1989) – Sue Kaller
Girlfriend from Hell (1989) – Diane
Midnight Ride (1990) – Joan
Freddy's Dead: The Final Nightmare (1991) – Tracy
Almost Pregnant (1992) – Party Girl
To Protect and Serve (1992) – Harriet
Movie Madness (1992)
A Place to Be Loved (1993) (TV) – Jeanette Glynn
Plump Fiction (1997) – Jodi / The Gimp
Never Sleep Again: The Elm Street Legacy (2010) – Self / Tracy (footage)
Devotion (2013) – Wendy

References

External links

1964 births
Actresses from Texas
American film actresses
American television actresses
Living people
National Football League cheerleaders
Roller derby skaters
American roller skaters
American cheerleaders
Musicians from Texas
People from Corsicana, Texas
21st-century American women